Night mayor (municipal title)

Films
Night Mayor
The Night Mayor